Lee Shapiro is an American musician/arranger who was a member of the band The Four Seasons.

Early life 
Shapiro was born in Passaic, New Jersey in 1953 and was raised in Glen Rock, New Jersey. 

Shapiro was 19 and studying at the Manhattan School of Music when he was invited to join the band The Four Seasons as keyboardist, arranger, and musical director. As a member of the band for seven years, he played on records such as their 1976 worldwide hit, December, 1963 (Oh, What a Night).

Later life 
In the 1980s, after leaving the Four Seasons, Shapiro collaborated on song writing with L. Russell Brown, Sandy Linzer and Irwin Levine. In 1991, Shapiro worked with Barry Manilow on Copacabana, The Musical.

In the 1990s, Shapiro also started Lee Shapiro Music, a company that worked on music for media outlets and advertising. The year 1999 saw Shapiro create the toys 'Rock N Roll Elmo' and 'Rock N Roll Ernie' for Fisher-Price.

Shapiro did not give up performing, and in 2010 he formed the band The Hit Men, fellow members included his former bandmates in The Four Seasons, Gerry Polci and Don Ciccone.

Shapiro was married in 1977 to Georgia and they have one daughter, Ariel.

In 2014, Shapiro was diagnosed with multiple sclerosis but continues to tour with The Hit Men.

Awards and accolades 
In 2019, the band The Hit Men were awarded its first "Road Warrior" award by the Musicians Hall of Fame and Museum in Nashville.

In 2020, Shapiro was nominated in the "Legend Musician" category of the East Coast Music Hall of Fame.

See also 
 The Four Seasons UK Appreciation Society e-book: The Rise and Fall of The New Four Seasons 1966 to 1977 (Note: Lee Shapiro is 4th from left clockwise in the cover photo): https://www.seasonally.co.uk/RiseandFall.html

References 

1953 births
Living people
Musicians from Passaic, New Jersey
American keyboardists